Thomas White (died May 10, 1868) was a Michigan politician.

Early life
White was born in Royalton, New York. There, he received an education.

Career
White moved to Novi, Michigan, in 1833 upon settling on a farm. In 1852, White moved to Northfield Township, Michigan, and settled on another farm. In 1868, White moved once again, to Ann Arbor, Michigan, where he worked for a county insurance company as a secretary and managing director. On November 6, 1866, White was elected to the Michigan House of Representatives, where he represented the Washtenaw County 2nd district from January 2, 1867, to December 31, 1868. At some point, White was a Democrat, and then a Free Soiler, but by the time of his term in the state house, he was a Republican.

Death
White died on May 10, 1868.

References

1868 deaths
Farmers from Michigan
Michigan Democrats
Michigan Free Soilers
Michigan Republicans
People from Royalton, New York
People from Novi, Michigan
Politicians from Ann Arbor, Michigan
Members of the Michigan House of Representatives
19th-century American politicians